Cattle Creek is a rural locality in the Toowoomba Region, Queensland, Australia. In the  Cattle Creek had a population of 19 people.

History 
The locality is named after one of the many creeks of that name in Queensland. The locality is on the old Dunmore pastoral run, occupied in the 1840s by Robert Logan.

In the  Cattle Creek had a population of 19 people.

References 

Toowoomba Region
Localities in Queensland